Clithon spinosum is a species of brackish water and freshwater snail with an operculum, a nerite. It is an aquatic gastropod mollusk in the family Neritidae, the nerites.

Distribution 
Distribution of Clithon spinosum include Indo-Pacific and it ranges from New Guinea and south-eastern Asia and eastern Asia to Marquesas. It also occurs in Japan, New Georgia, Fiji and Tahiti and in French Polynesia including the following Society Islands: Tahiti, Mo'orea, Raiatea, Huahine.

Description
There are always spines on its shell. Spines are long and thin and they are directed rearward. The width of the shell is 15–20 mm.

Ecology
Clithon spinosum is a dioecious (it has two separate sexes) and amphidromous snail. Adults live in freshwater and larvae are marine. Larvae are long-lived planktotrophs. Adults prefer boulders and cobbles over granules as a substrate. They were found mainly on bottom of rocks in aquaria and in situ. They are reported from altitude 0–10 m a.s.l. They can reach densities up to 57.0 ± 17.3 snails per square meter of a stream. Adults can survive 8 hours in seawater (longer exposure was not tested).

It is not used as food source by humans.

References

External links 

Neritidae
Gastropods described in 1825
Taxa named by George Brettingham Sowerby I